Aqaba (also ;) is the only coastal city in Jordan and the largest and most populous city on the Gulf of Aqaba. Situated in southernmost Jordan, Aqaba is the administrative center of the Aqaba Governorate. Today, Aqaba plays a major role in the development of the Jordanian economy, through the vibrant trade and tourism sectors. The Port of Aqaba also serves other countries in the region.

Aqaba's strategic location at the northeastern tip of the Red Sea between the continents of Asia and Africa has made its port important throughout thousands of years. The ancient city was called Elath, adopted in Latin as Aela and in Arabic as Ayla. Its strategic location and proximity to copper mines made it a regional hub for copper production and trade in the Chalcolithic period. Aela became a bishopric under Byzantine rule and later became a Latin Catholic titular see after Islamic conquest around AD 650, when it became known as Ayla; the name Aqaba is late medieval. The Great Arab Revolt's Battle of Aqaba, depicted in the film Lawrence of Arabia, resulted in victory for Arab forces over the Ottoman defenders.

Aqaba's location next to Wadi Rum and Petra has placed it in Jordan's golden triangle of tourism, which strengthened the city's location on the world map and made it one of the major tourist attractions in Jordan. The city is administered by the Aqaba Special Economic Zone Authority, which has turned Aqaba into a low-tax, duty-free city, attracting several mega projects like Ayla Oasis, Saraya Aqaba, Marsa Zayed and expansion of the Port of Aqaba. They are expected to turn the city into a major tourism hub in the region. However, industrial and commercial activities remain important, due to the strategic location of the city as the country's only seaport. The city sits right across the border from Eilat, likewise Israel's only port on the Red Sea. After the 1994 Israel Jordan Peace Treaty there were plans and hopes of establishing a trans-border tourism and economic area, but few of those plans have come to fruition.

Name
The name of the city was anciently Elath, Ailath. The name is presumably derived from the Semitic name of a tree in the genus Pistacia. 
Modern Eilat (established 1947), situated about 5 km north-west of Aqaba, also takes its name from the ancient settlement. In the Hellenistic period, it was renamed Berenice (in Greek Βερενίκη), but the original name survived, and under Roman rule was re-introduced in the forms Aila, Aela or Haila, adopted in Byzantine Greek as Άιλα Aila and in Arabic as Ayla (آيلا). The crusaders called the city Elyn.

The present name al-ʿAqaba is a shortened from ʿaqabat Aylah "the mountain-pass of Ayla", first mentioned in the 12th century by Idrisi, at a time when the settlement had been mostly reduced to a military stronghold, properly referring to the pass just to the north-east of the settlement (now traversed by Aqaba Highway).

History

Nearby Chalcolithic sites

Excavations at two tells (archaeological mounds) Tall Hujayrat Al-Ghuzlan and Tall Al-Magass, both a few kilometres north of modern-day Aqaba city, revealed inhabited settlements from c. 4000 BC during the Chalcolithic period, with thriving copper production on a large scale. This period is largely unknown due to the absence of written historical sources. University of Jordan 
archaeologists have discovered the sites, where they found a small building whose walls were inscribed with human and animal drawings, suggesting that the building was used as a religious site. The people who inhabited the site had developed an extensive water system in irrigating their crops which were mostly made up of grapes, olives and wheat. Several different-sized clay pots were also found suggesting that copper production was a major industry in the region, the pots being used in melting the copper and reshaping it. Scientific studies performed on-site revealed that it had undergone two earthquakes, with the latter one leaving the site completely destroyed.

Early history

Elath

The Edomites, who ruled over Edom just south of the Dead Sea, are believed to have built the first port in Aqaba called Elath around 1500 BC, turning it into a major hub for the trade of copper as the Phoenicians helped them develop their maritime economy. They profited from its strategic location at the junction of trading routes between Asia and Africa.

Tell el-Kheleifeh
Archaeologists have investigated an Iron Age settlement at Tell el-Kheleifeh, immediately west of Aqaba, inhabited between the 8th and 4th centuries BCE.

Undefined
Around 735 BC, the city was conquered by the Assyrian empire. Because of the wars the Assyrians were fighting in the east, their trading routes were diverted to the city and the port witnessed relative prosperity. The Babylonians conquered it in 600 BC. During this time, Elath witnessed great economic growth, which is attributed to the business background of its rulers who realized how important the city's location was. The Persian Achaemenid Empire took the city in 539 BC.

Classical antiquity

Hellenistic period
The city continued to grow and prosper which made it a major trading hub by the time of the Greek rule by 300 BC, after the Wars of Alexander the Great, it was described by a Greek historian to be "one of the most important trading cities in the Arab World". The Ptolemaic Greeks called it Berenice.

The Nabatean kingdom had its capital north of the city, at Petra.

Roman period

In 64 BC, following the Roman conquest, they annexed the city and called it Aela (also Haila, Aelana, in Greek rendered Αἴλα Aila).

Both Petra and Aela were under strong Nabatean influence despite the Roman rule. Aela reached its peak during Roman times, the great long-distance road the Via Traiana Nova led south from Bostra through Amman, terminating in Aela, where it connected with a west road leading to the Paralia and Roman Egypt.

Around AD 106 Aela was one of the main ports for the Romans.

Late Roman and Byzantine periods

The Aqaba Church was constructed under Roman rule between 293 and 303 and is considered to be the oldest known purpose-built Christian church in the world. By the time of Eusebius, Aela became the garrison of the Legio X Fretensis, which was moved to Aela from Jerusalem.

The city became a Christian bishopric at an early stage. Its bishop Peter was present at the First Council of Nicaea, the first ecumenical council, in 325. Beryllus was at the Council of Chalcedon in 451, and Paul at the synod called by Patriarch Peter of Jerusalem in 536 against Patriarch Anthimus I of Alexandria, a council attended by bishops of the Late Roman provinces of Palaestina Prima, Palaestina Secunda and Palaestina Tertia, to the last-named of which Aela belonged.

A citadel was also built in the area that became the focal point of the Roman southern defense system.

In the 6th century, Procopius of Caesarea mentioned a Jewish population in Eilat and its surroundings which enjoyed autonomy until the time of Justinian I.

According to Ibn Ishaq, Muhammad himself reached Aila during the expedition of Tabuk of 630, and extracted tribute from the city.

During the Late Byzantine or even Early Muslim period, Aila was the origin of what came to be known as the Ayla-Axum amphoras.

Early Muslim period
Aila fell to the Islamic armies by 629, and the ancient settlement was left to decay, while a new Arab city was established outside its walls under Uthman ibn Affan, known as Ayla.

The Early Muslim city was excavated in 1986 by a team from the University of Chicago. Artefacts are now on exhibit at Aqaba Archaeological Museum and Jordan Archaeological Museum in Amman. The fortified city was inscribed in a rectangle of 170 × 145 meters, with walls 2.6 meters thick and 4.5 meters high, surrounding a fortified structure, occupying an area of 35 × 55 meters. 24 towers defended the city. The city had four gates on all four sides, defining two main lines intersecting at the centre. The intersection of these two thoroughfares was indicated by a tetrapylon (a four-way arch), which was later transformed into a luxury residential building decorated with frescoes dated to the tenth century. This type of urban structure, called MSIR, is typical of early Islamic fortified settlements.

The city prospered from 661 to 750 under the Ummayads and beyond under the Abbasids (750–970) and the Fatimids (970–1116). Ayla took advantage of its key position as an important step on the road to India and Arab spices (frankincense, myrrh), between the Mediterranean Sea and the Arabian Peninsula. The city is also mentioned in several stories of the Arabian Nights.

The geographer Shams Eddin Muqaddasi describes Ayla as nearby the ruined ancient city.

The city was mentioned in Medieval Arabic sources as having a mixed population of Jews and Christians. It subsequently became an important station for pilgrim caravans on the way to Mecca.

Crusader/Ayyubid and Mamluk periods

Baldwin I of Jerusalem took over the city in 1115 without encountering much resistance. The centre of the city then moved to 500 meters along the coast to the south, and the crusader fortress of Elyn was built, which allowed the Kingdom of Jerusalem to dominate all roads between Damascus, Egypt, and Arabia, protecting the Crusader states from the east and allowing for profitable raids on trade caravans passing through the area.

The garrison of Elyn (now serving primarily as a military outpost) was further strengthened in 1142 by Pagan the Butler, Lord of Oultrejourdain, who pursued an ambitious program of castle building throughout his domain. However, there was no large-scale settlement of Europeans in the area, and the region between the Dead Sea and the Gulf of Aqaba remained mainly inhabited by Bedouins, who were obliged to pay tribute to the Lordship of Oultrejourdain. Despite all efforts to fortify the region, the city was captured in 1170 by a squadron sent by Saladin as he was besieging Gaza; while it was successfully raided by Raynald of Châtillon in 1182, it was never retaken by the Crusaders.

The old fort was rebuilt, as Aqaba Fortress, by Mamluk sultan Al-Ashraf Qansuh Al-Ghuri in the early 16th century. For the next four centuries, the site was a simple fishing village of little importance.

Modern history
During World War I, the Ottoman forces were forced to withdraw from Aqaba in 1917 after the Battle of Aqaba, led by T. E. Lawrence and the Arab forces of Auda Abu Tayi and Sherif Nasir. The capture of Aqaba allowed the British to supply the Arab forces. In 1918, the regions of Aqaba and Ma'an were officially incorporated into the Kingdom of the Hejaz. In 1925, Ibn Saud the ruler of Nejd with the help of his Wahhabi Ikhwan troops successfully annexed the Hejaz, but gave up the Ma'an and Aqaba to the British protectorate of Transjordan.

The Jordanian census of 1961 found 8,908 inhabitants in 'Aqaba.

In 1965, King Hussein, through an exchange deal with Saudi Arabia, gave  of desert land in Jordanian territories in exchange for other territories, including  of an extension of prime coastline south of Aqaba, which included the magnificent Yamanieh coral reef. Aqaba was a major site for imports of Iraqi goods in the 1980s until the Persian Gulf War.

Geography
The city lies at Jordan's southernmost point, on the Gulf of Aqaba lying at the tip of the Red Sea. Its strategic location is shown in the fact that it is located at the crossroads of the continents of Asia and Africa, while bordering Israel, Egypt and Saudi Arabia.

Climate
Aqaba has a hot desert climate (Köppen climate classification BWh) with warm winters and hot dry summers. Subzero temperatures can be observed every few years. It is deadly for tropical plants such as coconut trees.

Local government
In August 2000, the Aqaba Special Economic Zone Authority (ASEZA) was established which acted as the statutory institution empowered with administrative, fiscal, regulatory and economic responsibilities.

Administrative divisions
Jordan is divided into 12 administrative divisions, each called a Governorate. Aqaba Governorate divides into 3 Districts, some of which are divided into Subdistricts and further divided into villages.

Economy

Benefiting from its location and status as Jordan's special economic zone, Aqaba's economy is based on the tourism and port industry sectors. The economic growth in Aqaba is higher than the average economic growth in the country.  Under the special economic zone status some investments and trades are exempted from taxation, as a result, new resorts, housing developments, and retail outlets are being constructed.  New projects such as Tala Bay and Saraya al Aqaba are constructed aiming at providing high-end vacation and residential homes to locals and foreigners alike.

Aqaba's location next to Wadi Rum and Petra has placed it in Jordan's golden triangle of tourism, which strengthened the city's location on the world map and made it one of the major tourist attractions in Jordan. The city is administered by the Aqaba Special Economic Zone Authority, which has turned Aqaba into a low-tax, duty-free city, attracting several mega projects like Ayla Oasis, Saraya Aqaba, Marsa Zayed and expansion of the Port of Aqaba. They are expected to turn the city into a major tourism hub in the region. However, industrial and commercial activities remain important, due to the strategic location of the city as the country's only seaport.

Over US$20 billion have been invested in Aqaba since 2001 when the Special Economic Zone was established. Along with tourism projects, Aqaba has also attracted global logistic companies such as APM Terminals and Agility to invest in logistics, which boosted the city's status as a transport and logistics hub. There are numerous hotels that reside in Aqaba but new hotels are also under construction.

Aqaba is the only seaport of Jordan so virtually all of Jordan's exports depart from here.  Heavy machinery industry is also flourishing in the city with regional assembly plants being located in Aqaba such as the Land Rover Aqaba Assembly Plant. 
By 2008 the ASEZ had attracted $18bn in committed investments, beating its $6bn target by 2020 by a third and more in less than a decade. The goal was adjusted to bring in another $12bn by 2020, but in 2009 alone, deals worth $14bn were inked. Some projects currently under construction are:

 Marsa Zayed a $10 billion is the largest mega mixed-use development project ever envisioned in both Jordan and the region. Marsa Zayed will host facilities including residential neighborhoods, commercial outlets and amenities, entertainment venues, financial and business facilities, and a number of hotels. Additionally, the property will feature marinas and a cruise ship terminal. Marsa Zayed will encompass 6.4 million square meters of built-up property. 
Saraya Aqaba, a $1.5 billion resort with a man made lagoon, luxury hotels, villas, and townhouses that will be completed by 2017.
 Ayla Oasis, a $1.5 billion resort around a man made lagoon with hotels, villas, an 18-hole golf course designed by Greg Norman.  It also has an Arabian Venice theme with apartment buildings built along canals only accessible by walkway or boat. This project will be completed by 2017.
Tala Bay, Tala Bay was developed in a distinctive architectural style that blends Jordanian and regional architecture with total cost of US$680 million.  Another distinguishing feature of this single community resort is its two-kilometer private sandy beach on the Red Sea.
The Red Sea Astrarium (TRSA), the world's only Star Trek themed park, worth $1.5 billion would have been completed by 2014 but cancelled in 2015. 
Port relocation. Aqaba's current port will be relocated to the southernmost part of the province near the Saudi border. Its capacity will surpass that of the current port.  The project costs $5 billion, and it will be completed by 2013.
Aqaba will be connected by the national rail system which will be completed by 2013.  The rail project will connect Aqaba with all Jordan's main cities and economic centers and several countries like Saudi Arabia, Iraq, and Syria.
The Aqaba Container Terminal (ACT) handled a record 587,530 twenty-foot equivalent units (TEUs) in 2008, an increase of 41.6% on the previous year. To accommodate the rise in trade on the back of the increasing popularity of container shipping and the stabilising political situation in Iraq, the Aqaba Development Corporation (ADC) has announced plans for a new port. The port relocation  to the south will cost an estimated $600m and will improve infrastructure, while freeing up space for development in the city. Plans for upgrading the King Hussein International Airport (KHIA) and the development of a logistics centre will also help position Aqaba as a regional hub for trade and transport.

Tourism

Aqaba has a number of luxury hotels, including in the Tala Bay resort 20 km further to the south, which service those who come for fun on the beaches as well as Scuba diving. It also offers activities which take advantage of its desert location.  Its many coffee shops offer mansaf and knafeh, and baqlawa desserts. Another very popular venue is the Turkish Bath (Hamam) built in 306 AD, in which locals and visitors alike come to relax after a hot day.

In 2006, the Tourism Division of the Aqaba Special Economic Zone Authority (ASEZA) reported that the number of tourists visiting the Zone in 2006 rose to about 432,000, an increase of 5% over previous year. Approximately 65%, or 293,000 were Jordanians. Of foreign tourists, Europeans visited the Zone in the largest numbers, with about 98,000 visiting during
the year. The division has financed tourism advertising and media campaigns with the assistance of the European Union.

Aqaba has been chosen for the site of a new waterfront building project that would rebuild Aqaba with new man-made water structures, new high-rise residential and office buildings, and more tourist services to place Aqaba on the investment map and challenge other centers of waterfront development throughout the region.

Aqaba was chosen as the Arab Tourism City of 2011.

During the 5-day holiday at both the end of Ramadan and Eid Al-Adha, Jordanian and western expats flock into the city with numbers reaching up to 50,000 visitors. During this time the occupancy rate of most hotels there reaches as high as 90%, and are often fully booked.

It is to be noted that the several development projects (i.e. Ayla, Saraya etc.) now taking place in Aqaba provide "opportunities of empowerment" for local populations that want to expand their agency within the city. According to Fulbright scholar Kimberly Cavanagh development projects will help exhibit the ways global- local partnerships and the resultant cultural exchanges,  can result in mutually beneficial outcomes.

Demographics
The city of Aqaba has one of the highest population growth rates in Jordan in 2011, and only 44% of the buildings in the city had been built before 1990. A special census for Aqaba city was carried by the Jordanian department of statistics in 2007, the total population of Aqaba by the census of 2007 was 98,400.  The 2011 population estimate is 136,200. The results of the census compared to the national level are indicated as follows:

Religion

ِIslam represents the majority of the population of Aqaba, but Christianity still exists today. Approximately 5,000 Christian families live in the city. There are several churches in the city and multiple Christian schools including Rosary Sisters School Aqaba.

Cityscape

Residential buildings in Aqaba are made up of 4 stories, of which are covered with sandstone or limestone. The city has no high-rises; however, Marsa Zayed project is planned to dramatically change that reality through the construction of several high-rise towers that host hotels, residential units, offices and clinics.

Culture

Museums
The largest museum in Aqaba is the Aqaba Archaeological Museum.

Lifestyle
Aqaba has recently experienced a great growth in its nightlife, especially during the dramatic increase of tourist number in the 2000s.

Cuisine

The fact that the city is the only coastal city in Jordan has created a distinctive cuisine relative to other Jordanian cities. Main dishes include Sayadeyah, a combination of rice, fish and spices, a dish common among Arab coastal cities. Kishnah is fish, tomatoes and onions cooked together. Bukhari is made up of rice, meat, hummus beans, ghee and spices popular with wedding ceremonies. Aqabawi desserts include Al-Hooh, which consists of layers of pastry stuffed with nuts or dates that are then fried in ghee and dipped in sugar syrup. Dates and ghee, consisting of fresh dates dipped in ghee, is a simple dessert also commonly presented to guests.

Transport

Rail 
The Aqaba railway system is only used for cargo transportation and no longer functions for travelers, with the exception of the route to Wadi Rum. If and when an Israeli railway to Eilat is built, it might either be extended across the border to Jordan or enable passengers traveling from Gush Dan to Aqaba to cross the border via road transport.

Airports
King Hussein International Airport is the only civilian airport outside of Amman in the country, located to the north of Aqaba. It is a 20-minutes drive away from the city center. Regular flights are scheduled from Amman to Aqaba with an average flying time of 45 minutes which is serviced by Royal Jordanian Airlines and Jordan Aviation Airlines. Several international airlines connect the city to Istanbul, Dubai, Alexandria, Sharm el-Sheikh, and other destinations in Asia and Europe. Since the 1994 Peace Treaty between Israel and Jordan, there were plans to jointly develop airport infrastructure in the region.

Roads

Aqaba is connected by an  modern highway system to surrounding countries. The city is connected to the rest of Jordan by the Desert Highway and the King's Highway that provides access to the resorts and settlements on the Dead Sea. Aqaba is connected to Eilat in Israel by taxi and bus services passing through the Wadi Araba crossing. And to Haql in Saudi Arabia by the Durra Border Crossing. There are many bus services between Aqaba and Amman and the other major cities in Jordan, JETT and Trust International are the most common lines. These tourist buses are spacious and installed with air conditioning and bathrooms.

Port

The Port of Aqaba is the only port in Jordan. Regular ferry routes to Taba are available on a daily basis and are operated by several companies such as Sindbad for Marine Transportation and Arab Bridge Maritime. The routes serve mainly the Egyptian coastal cities on the gulf like Taba and Sharm Al Sheikh. In 2006, the port was ranked as being the "Best Container Terminal" in the Middle East by Lloyd's List. The port was chosen due to it being a transit cargo for other neighboring countries, its location between four countries and three continents, being an exclusive gateway for the local market and for the improvements it has recently witnessed.

Wildlife
Aqaba's gulf is rich with marine life, around 500 species of fish inhabit the gulf, many of which are residents, like lion fish and octopus, while others are migratory, appearing mostly during the summer, such as the world's fastest fish, the sailfish, as well as the world's largest fish, the whale shark. Marine mammals and reptiles also inhabit the gulf during summer, hawksbill sea turtles, and bottle nosed dolphins call Aqaba's gulf home as well. A large number of predatory shark species used to inhabit Aqaba's gulf, due to over fishing and pollution, the shark population in Aqaba is in a decline, which are mostly deep water sharks such as tiger sharks, thresher sharks, and a small number of reef sharks. The short-fin mako shark is the most common shark caught by fishermen in Aqaba, which is also the world's fastest shark, whereas whale sharks have the most common sightings, locally known as Battan. Conservationists are working hard to protect Aqaba's shark population.

Divers commonly stumble upon yellow-mouthed moray eels, blue spotted stingrays, eagle rays, Napoleon wrasse, frogfish, groupers, barracuda, clownfish and many other colourful and exotic species.

The gulf of Aqaba hosts more than 390 bird species including migratory birds such as the greater flamingo, great white pelican and the pink-backed pelican.

Education
The universities and institutes in Aqaba:

Twin towns – sister cities

Aqaba is twinned with:

 Alcamo, Italy
 Basra, Iraq
 Hammamet, Tunisia
 Saint Petersburg, Russia
 Sharm El-Sheikh, Egypt
 Ürümqi, China

Gallery

See also

 Aqaba Special Economic Zone Authority
 Disi Water Conveyance Project
 Midian

References

Bibliography

External links 

 Aqaba Marketing and Tourism Directorate
 Photos of Aqaba at the American Center of Research
 Photos of Aqaba / Ayla at the American Center of Research

 
Populated places in Aqaba Governorate
Cities in the Great Rift Valley
Port cities in the Arabian Peninsula
Port cities and towns of the Red Sea
Tourism in Jordan
Battlefields